In the 2005–06 season, USM Alger competed in the Division 1 for the 26th time, as well as the Algerian Cup.  It was their 11th consecutive season in the top flight of Algerian football. They were competing in Ligue 1, the CAF Champions League and the Algerian Cup.

Competitions

Overview

Division 1

League table

Results summary

Results by round

Matches

Algerian Cup

Champions League

First round

Second round

Squad information

Playing statistics

Appearances (Apps.) numbers are for appearances in competitive games only including sub appearances
Red card numbers denote:   Numbers in parentheses represent red cards overturned for wrongful dismissal.

Goalscorers
Includes all competitive matches. The list is sorted alphabetically by surname when total goals are equal.

Clean sheets
Includes all competitive matches.

Players
Last updated on  18 November 2016

Transfers

In

Out

References

USM Alger seasons
Algerian football clubs 2005–06 season